Lonesome Mountain is an  mountain summit located in Carbon County, Montana.

Description

Lonesome Mountain is located in the Beartooth Mountains, which are a subset of the Rocky Mountains. It is situated 4.2 miles north of Beartooth Butte in the Absaroka-Beartooth Wilderness, on land managed by Gallatin National Forest. The highest point in Montana, Granite Peak, rises 14.3 miles to the northwest. Precipitation runoff from the mountain drains into several surrounding alpine lakes which feed tributaries of the Clarks Fork Yellowstone River. This geographical feature's name has been officially adopted by the United States Board on Geographic Names.

Climate

Based on the Köppen climate classification, Lonesome Mountain is located in a subarctic climate zone characterized by long, usually very cold winters, and mild summers. Winter temperatures can drop below −10 °F with wind chill factors below −30 °F.

See also
 Geology of the Rocky Mountains

References

External links
 Weather forecast: Lonesome Mountain

Beartooth Mountains
Mountains of Montana
Mountains of Carbon County, Montana
North American 3000 m summits
Gallatin National Forest